Ana Paula Maia (born 1977) is a Brazilian writer and screenwriter.

Career
She graduated in computer science and communication science. Maia's first book, O Habitante das falhas subterrâneas was published in 2003. She is the author of the Saga dos Brutos (Saga of Brutes) trilogy , started with the short novels  Entre rinhas de cachorros e porcos abatidos (“Between Dog Fights and Pig Slaughter) and O Trabalho sujo dos outros (The dirty work of others) —published in a single volume— and concluded with the novel Carvão animal (carbo animalis).

Personal life
Maia was born in Nova Iguaçu, in the state of Rio de Janeiro; her mother is a literature teacher and his father is a bar owner. Maia grew up with books in her childhood, but lost interest in them in her adolescence, playing in a punk rock band during her teenage years.

Influences
Maia's writing is influenced by Dostoevsky, Edgar Allan Poe, Quentin Tarantino and Sergio Leone's films, TV series and pulp literature, among others. The main characters of her narratives are men, people working in essential and hazardous jobs, such as garbage collectors, coal miners and slaughterhouse workers.

She stated having no interest in writing about women, having said: "I am already a woman twenty-four hours a day. I want to be a man a little bit, a little rough. (...) I want to do something different. And I can only do that in literature, because in this life I won't be able to do that, I don't have that possibility.."

Awards
Maia won the São Paulo Prize for Literature for Best Novel twice, with Assim na Terra como embaixo da Terra, in 2018 and Enterre Seus Mortos, in 2019.

Works

2003: O habitante das falhas subterrâneas 
2007: A Guerra dos Bastardos 
2009: Entre rinhas de cachorros e porcos abatidos. Published together with  O trabalho sujo dos outros (Saga dos brutos #1 and #2)
2011: Carvão Animal (Saga dos Brutos #3)
English edition: Saga of Brutes; translated by Alexandra Joy Forman, Dalkey Archive Press, 2016. 
2013: De Gados e Homens 
2017: Assim na Terra como embaixo da Terra 
2018: Enterre Seus Mortos

References

External links
Author's page at Companhia das Letras (in Portuguese)
page at Editora Record (in Portuguese)

Living people
1977 births
Brazilian screenwriters
21st-century Brazilian women writers
People from Nova Iguaçu
Afro-Brazilian people
Brazilian women screenwriters
21st-century Brazilian novelists
21st-century screenwriters
Brazilian women novelists